The 1925–26 French Rugby Union Championship was won by the club of Toulouse that defeated the US Perpignan.

The Stade Toulousain won the fourth title on five years (after won in 1922, 1923 and 1924)

The championship was contested by 36 teams divided into 12 pools of three.

The first of each pool was qualified for the four pools of Quarter of finals.

First round 

In bold team qualified

 Pool A 
 Narbonne 6 pts
 Brive 4 pts
 Châteaurenard 2 pts
 Pool B 
US Perpignan 6 pts
 Lyon OU 3 pts
Hendaye 3 pts
 Pool C 
 US Perpignan 6 pts
 UA Libourne 3 pts
 Cognac 3 pts
 Pool D 
 Toulouse 6 pts
 Dax 3 pts
 Angoulême 3 pts
 Pool E 
 Stadoceste 5 pts
 SBUC 4 pts
 Bergerac 3 pts
 Pool F : 
  Béziers 5 pts
 Albi 4 pts
 Montferrand 3 pts
 Pool G : 
 Toulouse Olympique EC 6 pts
 Pau 4 pts
 Toulon2 pts
 Pool H : 
Bayonne 6 pts
 Lézignan 4 pts
 Montauban 2 pts
 Pool I 
 Lourdes 6 pts
 CASG 4 pts
 AS Bayonne 2 pts
 Pool J : 
 Carcassonne 6 pts,
 SA Bordeaux 4 pts,
 Boucau 2 pts
 Pool K :
 Grenoble 6 pts
 Biarritz  4 pts
 Limoges 2 pts
 Pool L 
 Stade Français 5 pts
 Begles 4 pts
 Périgueux 3 pts

Quarter of finals 

 Pool A : 
US Perpignan 6 pts, 
 Toulouse Olympique EC4 pts
 Stade Français 2 pts
 Pool B : 
 Stadoceste 5 pts
 Carcassonne4 pts
 Grenoble 3 pts
 Pool C 
 Bayonne 6 pts
 Narbonne 4 pts
 Lourdes 2 pts
 Pool D : 
 Toulouse 6 pts
 Béziers 4 pts, 
 Arlequins Perpignan 2 pts

Semifinals

Final

Other competitions

The 2 May 1926, in the final of "Championnat de France Honneur" (Second division), the Racing defeated SC Mazamet 17-3.

The SA Saint-Sever won the "Promotion" championship (3rd division) winning against The Dijon 16-11.

Le Stade Toulousain est champion of "2nd XV Championship" winning against the Stadoceste.

Sources 
 L'Humanité, 1926
Compte rendu de la finale de 1926, sur lnr.fr
 finalesrugby.com

1926
1925–26 rugby union tournaments for clubs
Championship